Schilde is a river of Mecklenburg-Vorpommern, Germany.  It is a left tributary of the Schaale. The Schaale flows into the Sude which is a tributary to the Elbe.

River course 
From here, the Schilde flow towards the south-west. In Camin (district of Vellahn), the Motel, the only notable tributary flows into the Schilde. The river flows then into the Schaale near Bennin, a district of Vellahn.

At the Schilde, the communities Pokrent, Lützow, Schildetal of district Nordwestmecklenburg and Wittendörp and Vellahn of district Ludwigslust-Parchim are situated.

Watershed 
The source area of the Schilde lies on the North Sea / Baltic Sea watershed: while the Schilde flows over the Elbe into the North Sea, the area north of the springs drains over the Stepenitz and the Trave into the Baltic Sea.

See also
 List of rivers of Mecklenburg-Vorpommern

Rivers of Mecklenburg-Western Pomerania
Rivers of Germany